The following is a list of Malayalam films released in the year 1989.

Dubbed films

References

 1989
1989
Malayalam
Fil